Gemma Doyle (born 13 April 1981) is a British Labour Co-operative politician, who was the Member of Parliament (MP) for West Dunbartonshire between 2010 and 2015.

Career 

She previously worked for the Labour Party, and before that for the Institution of Civil Engineers as a conference organiser, for the political communications company Holyrood Communications Ltd, and as a Labour party researcher for Cathy Craigie Labour MSP.

She had previously stood as a Labour candidate in Scotland at the 2004 European Parliament elections.

Member of Parliament 

In October 2010 she became Labour's Shadow Defence Minister for Defence Personnel, Welfare and Veterans, deputy to Shadow Defence Secretary Jim Murphy.  In 2011, she was a member of the special Select Committee set up to scrutinise the Bill that became the Armed Forces Act 2011.

Later career
Doyle lost her seat in the 2015 election, and after leaving parliament became director of a public affairs firm.

Doyle is a Trustee of the Foreign Policy Centre and chair of the Bermondsey and Old Southwark constituency Labour party.

Personal life 

Gemma Doyle was formerly married to Gregor Poynton, the Director of External Engagement at the Scottish Labour Party, who was formerly at Portland Communications and Blue State Digital. Poynton was the Labour candidate for North East Fife at the 2003 Scottish Parliament election.

References

External links

 

Living people
1981 births
Labour Co-operative MPs for Scottish constituencies
UK MPs 2010–2015
Female members of the Parliament of the United Kingdom for Scottish constituencies
Members of the Parliament of the United Kingdom for Scottish constituencies
21st-century Scottish women politicians
21st-century Scottish politicians